The Franklin County, New York, Highway Department maintains  of roads as county routes. All county routes in Franklin County are signed with a yellow and blue pentagon. Formerly, the county used  a green square marker that was unique to the county. There is no apparent pattern to how routes are assigned; however, no active county route has the same number as any of the county's U.S. Highways or New York state touring routes, with the exception of County Route 3 (CR 3). The section of New York State Route 374 (NY 374) that lies north of U.S. Route 11 (US 11) is owned and maintained by Franklin County and is thus co-signed as a state touring route and as a Franklin County route. The longest route in the county is CR 26, which was once NY 99.

Routes 1–30

Routes 31 and up

See also

County routes in New York

References

External links
Franklin County Highway Department County Routes Cross Reference